Mícheál Ó Muircheartaigh (born 20 August 1930) is an Irish Gaelic games commentator for the Irish national radio and television, RTÉ. In a career that has spanned six decades he has come to be regarded as the "voice of Gaelic games." He has been described as a national treasure. His prolific career has earned him a place in Guinness World Records.

Early life
Mícheál Ó Muircheartaigh was born in Dún Síon just outside Dingle, County Kerry in 1930.  Ó Muircheartaigh grew up on the family farm and was educated locally in Dingle. In September 1945 he began studying at Coláiste Íosagáin in Baile Bhúirne in the County Cork Gaeltacht where he was in training to be a teacher. It was at this all-Irish school that his name changed from Michael Moriarty to the Irish version Mícheál Ó Muircheartaigh. In September 1948 he began the final year of his teacher training at St Patrick's College of Education in Drumcondra, Dublin.

Broadcasting career
In early March 1949 Ó Muircheartaigh, along with ten other students from the college, and several from other colleges, did a test commentary on a hurling game at Croke Park. Each student had to commentate for five minutes in Irish and the most successful would be selected for further commentary work. Ó Muircheartaigh had never seen a game of hurling before in his life. But he knew that those adjudicators judging his commentary were not able to see the game:

Ó Muircheartaigh was the one selected and his first assignment was to provide an all-Irish commentary on the 1949 Railway Cup final on St. Patrick's Day.

He graduated from St. Patrick's College a little later and also completed a Bachelor of Arts degree (1952) from University College Dublin. He also completed a Higher Diploma in Education (1953). He taught economics, accountancy and Irish in both primary and secondary schools throughout Dublin, the majority of which were run by the Christian Brothers. He continued teaching up until the 1980s, when he became a full-time broadcaster with Raidió Teilifís Éireann.

For the early part of his broadcasting career Ó Muircheartaigh commentated on Minor GAA matches, in the Irish language. He also replaced the legendary Micheál O'Hehir when he was not available to commentate. Eventually when O'Hehir was forced to retire in the mid-1980s Ó Muircheartaigh took over as the station's premier radio commentator. He developed his own inimitable style of commentary and his accent is unmistakably that of a native Irish speaker. He is a true lover of Gaelic Athletic Association and it is reflected in the enthusiasm he brings to matches. His unusual turn of phrase has made him a much loved broadcaster and often imitated character. He has become particularly famous in Ireland for his unusual turns of phrase in the heat of the moment while commentating. Today he commentates on RTÉ Radio 1. In 2004 he published his autobiography, 'From Dún Sion to Croke Park'.

Ó Muircheartaigh's commentaries for RTÉ Radio 1's Sunday Sport show won him a Jacob's Award in 1992. He was also the Parade Grand Marshal for the 2007 St. Patrick's Festival, having been given the honour by the chairman of the Festival in recognition and appreciation of his unique contribution to Irish culture.  He was the Parade Grand Marshal for the 2011 St. Patrick's Parade in Toronto, Ontario, Canada, also in recognition and appreciation of his unique contribution to Irish culture.

On 16 September 2010 he announced his retirement from broadcasting.
The last All-Ireland he commentated on was the 2010 All-Ireland Senior Football Championship Final on 19 September 2010.
On 29 October 2010 it was announced that the 2nd International Rules test at Croke Park would be Ó Muircheartaigh's final broadcast as commentator on RTÉ Radio 1. 
On 30 October 2010 Micheál commentated his final commentary alongside RTÉ's pundit and former Meath footballer Bernard Flynn.

He was contracted to officiate at the 2011–12 Volvo Ocean Race finish in Galway where he commentated on the finish to the round the world race, to give it a uniquely Irish conclusion. Sailing has been a long time hobby of O Muircheartaigh.

Ó Muircheartaigh wrote a weekly sports column for Foinse, the Irish-language newspaper free with the Irish Independent each Wednesday.

Ó Muircheartaigh was invited to read out a piece in Irish and in English at an event called "Laochra" in Croke Park on 24 April 2016 to commemorate the 100th anniversary of the Easter Rising.

O'Muircheartaigh's nephew by marriage, John McGuire, has presented several programmes on RTÉ.

In 2007, Ó Muircheartaigh was awarded the UCD Foundation Day Medal.

Other media
Ó Muircheartaigh is the main commentator in the 2005 video game Gaelic Games: Football  for the PlayStation 2 and its 2007 sequel.

He was featured in the video "Mícheál Ó Muircheartaigh - Making a ham sandwich" which was posted on a Reddit forum, noting his "relaxing" voice.

Honours
Ó Muircheartaigh was awarded an honorary doctorate by NUI Galway in 1999 for his lifetime service to broadcasting.

Shortly after his 90th birthday, Ó Muircheartaigh was awarded the only All Star of 2020. No further All Stars could be awarded as competition was suspended due to the COVID-19 pandemic and only completed that December.

Bibliography
 From Dún Síon to Croke Park - The Autobiography Micheál Ó Muircheartaigh

References

External links

1930 births
Living people
Alumni of St Patrick's College, Dublin
Gaelic games commentators
Irish sports broadcasters
Jacob's Award winners
People from Dingle
RTÉ Radio 1 presenters
RTÉ television presenters
20th-century Irish people
21st-century Irish people